Neocalyptis sabahia is a species of moth of the family Tortricidae. It is found on Borneo.

References

	

Moths described in 2005
Neocalyptis